Rhynchanthrax is a genus of bee flies (insects in the family Bombyliidae). There are about seven described species in Rhynchanthrax.

Species
These seven species belong to the genus Rhynchanthrax:
 Rhynchanthrax capreus (Coquillett, 1887) i c g b
 Rhynchanthrax maria (Williston, 1901) i c
 Rhynchanthrax nigrofimbriata (Williston, 1901) i c
 Rhynchanthrax parvicornis (Loew, 1869) i c g b
 Rhynchanthrax quivera (Painter, 1933) i
 Rhynchanthrax rex (Osten Sacken, 1886) i c
 Rhynchanthrax texanus (Painter, 1933) i c g
Data sources: i = ITIS, c = Catalogue of Life, g = GBIF, b = Bugguide.net

References

Further reading

 

Bombyliidae genera
Articles created by Qbugbot